North San Ysidro is an unincorporated community and census-designated place in San Miguel County, New Mexico, United States. Its population was 159 as of the 2010 census.

Geography

Demographics

Education
It is within Pecos Independent Schools.

References

Census-designated places in New Mexico
Census-designated places in San Miguel County, New Mexico